Shoreline Park can refer to:

Shoreline Park, Mississippi, USA; unincorporated community
Shoreline Park, Santa Barbara, California, USA; a park
Shoreline Park, Mountain View, California, USA; a park

See also

 Middle Harbor Shoreline Park, Oakland, California, USA; a park
 
 Shoreline (disambiguation)